Bryan Robert Walters (born November 4, 1987) is a former American football wide receiver. He played college football at Cornell, where he was elected to the Sphinx Head Society. With the Seattle Seahawks, he won Super Bowl XLVIII over the Denver Broncos.

Collegiate career
Walters played college football at Cornell University for the Big Red.

Professional career

San Diego Chargers
Walters signed with the San Diego Chargers on April 25, 2010 after going undrafted in the 2010 NFL Draft.

Walters was released by the Chargers on August 5, 2010 during training camp, due to a hamstring injury, but was re-signed to their practice squad on December 1, 2010. After the 2010 season, Walters signed a future contract with the Chargers on January 12, 2011.

The Chargers released him on March 13, 2012.

Minnesota Vikings
On April 2, 2012, he signed with the Minnesota Vikings.  On August 25, 2012, he was released by the Vikings.

Seattle Seahawks
After his Vikings stint, Walters was signed to a futures contract by the Seattle Seahawks, the team he grew up rooting for.

Walters was released by the Seahawks on November 9, 2013. Walters was re-signed to the Seahawks' practice squad, and was promoted to the active roster on December 19, 2013, after the suspension of cornerback Brandon Browner.
Walters won Super Bowl XLVIII with the Seahawks after they defeated the Denver Broncos, 43–8.

Walters was released by the Seahawks during final roster cuts on August 30, 2014. On September 1, 2014, Walters was re-signed by the Seahawks. He was waived on November 1, 2014.  He was re-signed on November 4.
The Seahawks would return to the Super Bowl, but lost 28–24 to the New England Patriots in Super Bowl XLIX.

Jacksonville Jaguars
Walters signed with the Jacksonville Jaguars on March 13, 2015. He was released on September 20, 2015,  and was re-signed by the Jaguars two days later on September 22, 2015.

On September 24, 2016, he was released by the Jaguars. He re-signed with the team on September 26.

On March 9, 2017, Walters re-signed with the Jaguars. On May 22, 2017 he was placed on injured reserve after suffering a foot injury. He was released from injured reserve on May 31, 2017.

References

External links
 Seattle Seahawks bio
 San Diego Chargers bio

1987 births
Living people
American football wide receivers
Cornell Big Red football players
San Diego Chargers players
Minnesota Vikings players
Seattle Seahawks players
Jacksonville Jaguars players
Players of American football from Washington (state)
Sportspeople from Kirkland, Washington